Usilampatti is a railway station on Madurai–Bodinayakkanur branch line. It is located in Madurai district, Tamil Nadu state, India. The station consists of two platforms, which are not well sheltered.

Location 
Usilampatti railway station serves Usilampatti town in Madurai district. It pertains to Madurai railway division, part of Southern Railway zone of Indian Railways.

History 
Later in 1942, during the Second World War, the line was closed and the tracks were removed. After India's Independence, between 1953 and 1954, the track was restored.

The Madurai–Bodinayakkanur line was sanctioned for gauge conversion, from metre gauge to broad gauge. It was closed on 1 of January 2011, expecting to reopen it by 2012, but due to lack of funds, the project advanced at very slow pace.

Services 
As of January 2020, there are no train services.

Timetable

References 

Railway stations in Madurai district
Madurai railway division
Railway stations opened in 1928